Hershey is an unincorporated community and census-designated place (CDP) in Derry Township, Dauphin County, Pennsylvania, United States. It is home to The Hershey Company, which was founded by candy magnate Milton S. Hershey.

Hershey has no legal status as an incorporated municipality, and all its municipal services are provided by Derry Township. The population was 13,858 at the 2020 census.

History
The town was founded by Hershey in 1903 for the company’s workers, and their homes had modern amenities such as electricity, indoor plumbing, and central heating. The town had a public trolley system, a free school to educate the children of employees, a free vocational school to train orphaned and underprivileged boys, and later an amusement park, golf courses, community center, hotel, zoo, and a sports area.

The purpose was to provide "a perfect American town in a bucolic natural setting, where healthy, right-living, and well-paid workers lived in safe, happy homes."

Geography
Hershey is located in southeastern Dauphin County, in the center and eastern parts of Derry Township. It is bordered to the east by Palmdale (also in Derry Township) and by Campbelltown (in South Londonderry Township, Lebanon County). To the west is the borough of Hummelstown. Over half the population of Derry Township is within the Hershey CDP.

Demographics

2020
As of the 2020 census, there were 13,858 people living there. Hershey was made up of 82.3% White, 5.5% Asian, 2.7% African American, and 1.1% in other categories. 10.7% identify as Hispanic or Latino.

2010
As of the 2010 census, there were 14,257 people living there. Hershey was made up of 83.5% White, 6.6% Asian, 6.2% African American, and 3.5% in other categories. 3.4% identify as Hispanic or Latino.

Transportation
U.S. Route 422, also known as Chocolate Avenue, runs through the center of Hershey, and U.S. Route 322, also known as Governor Road, passes south of the center. The two highways merge at the western end of Hershey at an interchange with Pennsylvania Route 39. US 422 leads east  to Reading, and US 322 leads southeast  to Ephrata and west  to Harrisburg, the state capital. Route 39 provides access to Hersheypark and Chocolate World, located in the northern part of the CDP, and continues north  to Interstate 81 at Skyline View.

Amtrak's Keystone Service provides frequent rail service to the nearby towns of Middletown (9 miles), Harrisburg (13 miles) and Elizabethtown Amtrak Station (11 miles), as well as its eastern terminus in Philadelphia (95 miles). CAT and LT (formerly known as COLT) provide bus service.

From 1944 to 1981, Hershey had its own small general aviation airport on the front lawn of the Milton Hershey Middle School.

Climate
Hershey has a humid continental climate (Dfa), as is very common in Pennsylvania. Temperatures can reach up to 95 °F in the summer, and fall below 20 °F in the winter. The hardiness zones are 6b and 7a.

Education
Derry Township School District, public school district
Hershey High School, public high school
The Vista School, state-approved, private school for autistic students aged 3 to 21 years
Milton Hershey School, private philanthropic school founded in 1909 by chocolate magnate Milton Hershey to serve poor children. Currently serves children from pre-kindergarten through twelfth grade
Penn State University College of Medicine, medical school affiliated with Hershey Medical Center

Sports

Hershey was once home to the Hershey Wildcats of the A-League, a professional soccer team. The team folded after the 2001 season when its owners decided that it would not be successful financially.  The Wildcats were named after a popular roller-coaster in Hersheypark. Hershey was also home to the Hershey Impact over the NPSL indoor soccer league.

National Basketball Association player Wilt Chamberlain scored 100 points for the Philadelphia Warriors in a regular season game played at Hersheypark Arena in 1962; his effort remains a single-game record for the league.

Elizabethtown College hosted the 2015 NCAA Division III Wrestling Championships at the Giant Center.

Christian Pulisic, the 23-year-old American soccer player who plays for Chelsea F.C. of England's Premier League and the United States men's national soccer team, is from Hershey.

Points of interest

The community is home to The Hershey Company, which makes the well-known Hershey Bar and Hershey's Kisses and is the parent company of the H. B. Reese Candy Company, manufacturer of Reese's Peanut Butter Cups. Hershey's Chocolate World is a factory store and virtual tour ride of The Hershey Company. The original Hershey Chocolate Factory, located downtown along Chocolate Avenue, was closed in 2012 due to high operational costs. Although many of the former factory buildings have been demolished, several were converted to modern office space.

Hershey Entertainment and Resorts Company owns and operates Hersheypark, Hersheypark Stadium, and other attractions such as ZooAmerica and Hershey Gardens, and is a major employer of the community and surrounding area. Every October since 1955, the Antique Automobile Club of America have hosted the AACA Eastern Fall Meet here. Usually referred to simply as "Hershey", this is often claimed to be the world's largest automotive swap meet.

The Penn State Milton S. Hershey Medical Center and the Milton Hershey School for underprivileged youth are also located in Hershey.

The Pennsylvania State Police Academy is located north along Hersheypark Drive. In addition, the Derry Township Police Department is a nationally recognized law enforcement agency.

Hershey is also home to four world-class golf courses, a few museums, The Hotel Hershey, and an opulent spa.

Hersheypark Stadium hosts concerts and sporting events, with a capacity of 30,000. It is also the venue of the Cocoa Bean Game between the Hershey High School and Milton S. Hershey High School football teams.

 AACA Museum, operated by the Antique Automobile Club of America
 GIANT Center, home of the Hershey Bears
 Hershey Area Playhouse
 Hershey Cemetery
 Hershey Center for Applied Research
 Hershey Country Club
 Hershey Gardens
 Hershey Lodge and Convention Center
 Hershey Museum
 Hershey Public Library
 Hershey Recreation Center
 Hershey Theatre
 Hershey's Chocolate World
 Hersheypark
 Hersheypark Arena
 Hersheypark Stadium 
 Hershey-Derry Township Historical Society
 Hotel Hershey
 Indian Echo Caverns
 Milton Hershey School
 Milton S. Hershey Mansion
 Parkview Cross Country Course
 Tanger Outlets
 The Hershey Story
 Tröegs Brewing Company
 ZooAmerica

In popular culture

Hershey Park plays a large role in the American Dad episode "May the Best Stan Win" where Stan must fight his cyborg clone for the affection of his wife Francine. There is even a musical number called "At Hershey Park" sung by a chorus of back-up singers at the park.

In Mad Men, Donald Draper was raised in a brothel in Hershey.

In The Simpsons episode "Homerland", Homer says: "I’ve never prayed to a city in my life and if I did it’d be Hershey, Pennsylvania."

Hershey was also mentioned in The Good Doctor, when it was revealed that Shaun Murphy's (main character) love interest, Lea (played by Paige Spara) is moving to Hershey, Pa. to work in her family's auto body shop.

Notable people
Brian Baker, actor
John Bilbrey, director at McCormick & Company and former CEO and president of Hershey Company
Michele Buck, CEO and president of the Hershey Company
Scott Campbell, professional football player in National Football League (NFL)
Gigi Cesarè, actress and recording artist
Deesha Dyer, White House Social Secretary
Garry Gilliam, former Penn State University and former San Francisco 49ers offensive linesman
Milton S. Hershey, confectioner and philanthropist
Lois Herr, progressive activist
John Huzvar, professional football player in NFL
Jules Jordan, film director and actor
Nellie King, former Major League Baseball pitcher for Pittsburgh Pirates
Kellen Kulbacki, professional baseball player in Major League Baseball
George M. Leader, Governor of Pennsylvania
Trymaine Lee, Pulitzer Prize-winning journalist and national reporter for MSNBC
Mark Malkoff, comedian and writer
The Ocean Blue, alternative rock band, formed in Hershey.
Steven Pasquale, television actor
John D. Payne, state Congressman
Christian Pulisic, soccer player for Chelsea F.C. and United States men's national soccer team
Da'Vine Joy Randolph, Tony Award-nominated actress
H.B. Reese, inventor of Reese's Peanut Butter Cups and founder of the H.B. Reese Candy Company, lived and built his two candy factories in Hershey.
Nate Saint, American missionary
Joe Senser, former NFL tight end for Minnesota Vikings and former board member of the Hershey Trust Company and Hershey Entertainment & Resorts Company
John B. Sollenberger, sports and entertainment executive
Andrew Joseph Stack III, who flew a Piper Dakota airplane into an IRS Building in Austin, Texas as a tax protest in 2010
Jay Taylor, professional football player in NFL
Dave Twardzik, professional basketball player in NBA
Chris Villarrial, professional football player in the NFL and head football coach at Saint Francis University
Richard Winters, U.S. Army major
Michelle Wolf, comedian
David Nolan, Stanford University swimmer

References

External links

 Hershey Community Archives website
 Preserve Hershey organization
 The Sun newspaper
 Hershey New Years.org

 
1903 establishments in Pennsylvania
Census-designated places in Dauphin County, Pennsylvania
Company towns in Pennsylvania
Harrisburg–Carlisle metropolitan statistical area
Populated places established in 1903
Census-designated places in Pennsylvania